The Şirinyer Tunnel is a  long tunnel that carries the Southern Line under Mehmet Akif street and Şirinyer station plaza. The tunnel also houses the Şirinyer railway station which are serviced by İZBAN commuter trains to Alsancak and Tepeköy railway station. Groundbreaking for the tunnel was done on 24 July 2006 and was opened to railway traffic on 19 May 2010.

References

Railway tunnels in Turkey
Transport in İzmir Province
Tunnels completed in 2010
Underground commuter rail